Amir Haider Shah Sheerazi is a Pakistani politician who had been a Member of the Provincial Assembly of Sindh from May 2013 to May 2018.

Early life 
He was born on 4 September 1981 in Thatta.

Political career

He was elected to the Provincial Assembly of Sindh as an independent candidate from Constituency PS-85 THATTA-II in 2013 Pakistani general election.

References

Living people
Sindh MPAs 2013–2018
1981 births